JoAnne Stubbe is an American chemist best known for her work on ribonucleotide reductases, for which she was awarded the National Medal of Science in 2009. In 2017, she retired as a Professor of Chemistry and Biology at the Massachusetts Institute of Technology.

Career and education
In 1946, Stubbe was born in Champaign, Illinois. In 1968, Stubbe received a BS degree in chemistry from the University of Pennsylvania, and worked as an undergraduate in the laboratory of Professor Edward R. Thornton. After she received her PhD degree in organic chemistry  under the guidance of Professor George Kenyon from the University of California, Berkeley in 1971, she did a very brief stint (1971-1972) as a postdoc at UCLA, where she worked on synthesizing LSD from tryptophan with Julius Rebek. Then, Stubbe taught at Williams College (1972-1977) discovered she didn't want to teach, but wanted to do research. Her realization sent her to Brandeis University (1975-1977), where she did a second postdoc with Bob Abeles. This is where she learned the art and science of creating mechanism-based enzyme inhibitors. She also taught at Yale School of Medicine (1977-1980) as an assistant professor in the department of pharmacology.

In 1980, she moved to the University of Wisconsin, serving as assistant professor in the Biochemistry Department and rising to full professor in 1985. She was an assistant professor for a total of 12 years. In 1987, Stubbe became a professor in the MIT Chemistry Department, where she became the first woman to receive tenure in that department. She received a joint appointment in the MIT Biology Department in 1990.

Research 
Stubbe has published over 300 scientific papers and has been frequently recognized for her research achievements. Before Stubbe's work, there were no chemical mechanisms that could be written for certain enzymes. She revolutionized the biochemistry field with her first two scientific papers on enzymes enolase and pyruvate kinase.

Her first two publications in scientific journals showed the mechanisms for reactions that involved the enzymes enolase that metabolizes carbohydrates, and pyruvate kinase. Her first groundbreaking experiments were carried out in the late 1970s and early 1980s, while she was at Yale, then the University of Wisconsin. She was trying to understand how the hydroxyl group at the 2’ position of the ribonucleotide's sugar was replaced by the hydrogen found in deoxyribonucleotides. To perform these experiments, she had to synthesize nucleotides that carried a heavy isotope at specific positions. Stubbe reportedly kept a bed in her office since she worked around the clock on her experiments. Stubbe pioneered the use of spectroscopic investigations of enzyme interactions and has devoted most of her career to elucidating the biochemical mechanisms behind free radicals. In her early work at Yale and then at the University of Wisconsin, Stubbe discovered how enzymes called ribonucleotide reductases use free-radical chemistry to convert nucleotides into deoxynucleotides, an essential process in DNA repair and replication. These enzymes catalyze the rate-determining step in DNA biosynthesis. Her analysis of the nucleotide reduction process shed light on the mechanism of action of the Eli Lilly & Co. anti-cancer drug gemcitabine, which is used to treat various carcinomas, such as pancreatic cancer, breast cancer, and non-small cell lung cancer.

Stubbe, in collaboration with John Kozarich, also elucidated the structure and function of bleomycin, an antibiotic that is commonly used to treat cancer. They discovered how bleomycin induces DNA strand breaks in tumor cells, which in turn induces apoptosis.

Before retiring, Stubbe studied the function of ribonucleotide reductases and the mechanisms of clinically useful drugs. She also extended her research into polyhydroxybutyrates, a class of biodegradable polymers that can be synthesized by bacteria under certain conditions and then converted into plastics. Stubbe's other research interests included the design of so-called suicide inhibitors and mechanisms of DNA repair enzymes.

Stubbe was active on several committees, including review boards for the NIH grants committee and the editorial boards for various scientific journals.

Personal life 
Stubbe's parents were teachers, and that is why she thought teaching is what she originally wanted to do as a career. Stubbe had a pet dog named Dr. McEnzyme Stubbe. The dog was a part of the research group and had its own email address and picture on the group's website.

Scientific societies 
 1991 American Academy of Arts and Sciences
1992 United States National Academy of Sciences (Biochemistry section)
2004 American Philosophical Society 
American Chemical Society 
American Society for Biological Chemists 
Protein Society

Awards and honors
 1986 Pfizer Award in Enzyme Chemistry
 1989 ICI – Stuart Pharmaceutical Award for Excellence in Chemistry
 1990 MIT teaching award
 1991 American Academy of Arts and Sciences Fellow Award
 1992 Myron L. Bender and Muriel S. Bender Distinguished Summer Lecturer, Northwestern University
1993 Arthur C. Cope Scholar Award of the American Chemical Society
 1996 Richards Medal from northeastern section of ACS
 1997 Alfred Bader Award in Bioinorganic or Bioorganic Chemistry of the American Chemical Society
1998 F.A. Cotton Medal for Excellence in Chemical Research of the American Chemical Society
 2004 Repligen Award
 2005 John Scott Award
 2008 Protein Society Emil Thomas Kaiser Award
 2008 National Academy of Sciences Award in Chemical Sciences
 2008 Kirkwood Medal
2009 American Chemical Society's Nakanishi Prize for identifying the role of radical intermediates in ribonucleotide reductase functions.
2009 National Medal of Science "for her groundbreaking experiments establishing the mechanisms of ribonucleotide reductases, polyester synthases, and natural product DNA cleavers — compelling demonstrations of the power of chemical investigations to solve problems in biology."
2009 Prelog Medal, Laboratory of Organic Chemistry at the Swiss Federal Institute of Technology, Zurich 
2010 Benjamin Franklin Medal in Chemistry of The Franklin Institute for uncovering the intricate processes by which cells safely use free radicals, for developing new cancer treatments, and for improving the production of environmentally-friendly polymers.
 2010 Welch Award for "fundamental research in biochemistry and enzymology." 
 2010 Murray Goodman Memorial Prize
 2013 Honorary doctor of the Harvard University 
 2014 Penn Chemistry Distinguished Alumni Award
 2015 American Chemical Society Remsen Award
2017 Pearl Meister Greengard Prize
 2020 American Chemical Society Priestley Medal

References

Massachusetts Institute of Technology School of Science faculty
21st-century American chemists
University of Pennsylvania alumni
University of California, Berkeley alumni
Living people
Members of the United States National Academy of Sciences
American women chemists
1946 births
Fellows of the American Academy of Arts and Sciences
Members of the American Philosophical Society
National Medal of Science laureates
21st-century American women scientists